Ora Anlen (née Goldstein; ; 15 August 1944 – July 10, 2022) was an Israeli Paralympic champion.

Anlen was born in Kibbutz HaMa'apil. As a young baby she contracted polio and remained paralyzed in both lower limbs. In 1964 she began practicing sports at the Israel Sports Center for the Disabled and was active in swimming, athletics and wheelchair basketball.

In 1966 she participated for the first time in an international competition. She won 5 medals in the Stoke Mandeville Games that year, and in 1968 won 4 medals and gained a world record during the 1968 Summer Paralympics. Anlen continued to excel, winning seven medals in the 1971 Stoke Mandeville Games, 5 medals in the 1972 Summer Paralympics, and 4 medals in the 1976 Summer Paralympics. Over the years she won 13 Paralympic medals and held three world records.

Anlen was married since 1977 to Haim Anlen, a delegate to the 1976 Summer Paralympics.

References 
 

1944 births
2022 deaths
Israeli female discus throwers
Paralympic athletes of Israel
Athletes (track and field) at the 1968 Summer Paralympics
Athletes (track and field) at the 1972 Summer Paralympics
Athletes (track and field) at the 1976 Summer Paralympics
Israeli female swimmers
Israeli women's wheelchair basketball players
Paralympic swimmers of Israel
Swimmers at the 1968 Summer Paralympics
Swimmers at the 1972 Summer Paralympics
Swimmers at the 1976 Summer Paralympics
Paralympic wheelchair basketball players of Israel
Wheelchair basketball players at the 1972 Summer Paralympics
Paralympic gold medalists for Israel
Paralympic silver medalists for Israel
Paralympic bronze medalists for Israel
People with paraplegia
Medalists at the 1968 Summer Paralympics
Medalists at the 1972 Summer Paralympics
Medalists at the 1976 Summer Paralympics
Track and field athletes with disabilities
Swimmers with disabilities
Paralympic medalists in athletics (track and field)
Paralympic medalists in swimming
Paralympic medalists in wheelchair basketball
Female breaststroke swimmers
People from Central District (Israel)
Wheelchair category Paralympic competitors